The Mazaro (spelt also as Màzaro) is a river in Sicily, Italy.

It is a historically important river which has provided water and farming for the people living around it for centuries. The Greeks and Muslims used the river for water to supply their armies in Sicily. The river is shallow. It is a river connected to the Mediterranean Sea.

"Mad sea" phenomenon
The river is characterized by a periodical phenomenon locally known as marrobbio (also known in English as "mad sea"), which consist in rapid and dramatic sea level oscillations seemingly caused by sudden atmospheric pressure changes; similar phenomenons were observed only in a very few other places in the world, including Nagasaki Bay in Japan (where the phenomenon is known as abiki) and Ciutadella (in Menorca, Spain, where it is called rissaga).

References

Rivers of Italy
Rivers of Sicily
Mazara del Vallo
Rivers of the Province of Trapani
European drainage basins of the Mediterranean Sea